Henry Djanik (1926–2008) was a French actor.

Filmography
Manina, the Girl in the Bikini (1952)
 This Man Is Dangerous (1953)
Tintin et le temple du soleil (1969)
Biribi (1971)
Peur sur la ville (1975)
I... comme Icare (1979)
Le Big-Bang (1987)

External links

1926 births
2008 deaths
French people of Armenian descent
French male film actors
French male television actors
French male voice actors